Oscar García (born 23 December 1966) is a Cuban fencer. He won a silver medal in the team foil event at the 1992 Summer Olympics and a bronze in the same event at the 1996 Summer Olympics.

References

1966 births
Living people
Cuban male fencers
Olympic fencers of Cuba
Fencers at the 1992 Summer Olympics
Fencers at the 1996 Summer Olympics
Fencers at the 2000 Summer Olympics
Olympic silver medalists for Cuba
Olympic bronze medalists for Cuba
Olympic medalists in fencing
Sportspeople from Havana
Medalists at the 1992 Summer Olympics
Medalists at the 1996 Summer Olympics
Pan American Games medalists in fencing
Pan American Games gold medalists for Cuba
Fencers at the 1987 Pan American Games
Fencers at the 1991 Pan American Games
Fencers at the 1995 Pan American Games
Fencers at the 1999 Pan American Games
20th-century Cuban people
21st-century Cuban people